The Purakaunui Falls are a cascading three-tiered waterfall on the Purakaunui River, in The Catlins of the southern South Island of New Zealand. As one of very few South Island waterfalls away from the alpine region, it has long been a popular destination and photographic subject.

The falls are an iconic image for The Catlins region, and were featured on a New Zealand postage stamp in 1976.

Location
They can be reached via a short 10-minute bush walk from a car park on the Waikoato Valley / Purakaunui Falls Road, a gravel side-road off the main Owaka-Invercargill road. There are toilets and a picnic area. The small, well-signposted detour to the falls is popular with tourist travellers along the Southern Scenic Route, and prominently mentioned in brochures about the area.

A small viewing platform near the top of the falls is accessible by wheelchair. Steps continue down to the main viewing platform at the base of the  three tiered cascade.

See also
 List of waterfalls of New Zealand
 McLean Falls

References

External links
 Official website for The Catlins
 Purakaunui Falls on 10c stamp of the 1976 waterfalls stamp series

Waterfalls of New Zealand
Landforms of Otago
The Catlins
Clutha District